Jama Masjid (also known as both Kala Masjid and Motijheel Mosque) is a congregational mosque located at Motijhil, in the historic city of Murshidabad, West Bengal, India.

Geography

Location

Jama Masjid stands on the western bank of Motijhil.

Hazarduari Palace and its associated sites in the Kila Nizamat area (forming the central area in the map alongside) is the centre of attraction in Murshidabad. Just a little away are Katra Masjid, Fauti Mosque, Jama Masjid and the Motijhil area. There is a group of attractions in the northern part of the town (as can be seen in the map alongside). Some attractions such as Khushbagh, Rosnaiganj, Baranagar, Kiriteswari Temple, Karnasuvarna and others are on the other side of the river and there are attractions in the neighbouring Berhampore area also (not shown in the map).

Note: The map alongside presents some of the notable locations in Murshidabad city. Most of the places marked in the map are linked in the larger full screen map. A few, without pages yet, remain unmarked. The map has a scale. It will help viewers to find out the distances.

Jama Masjid

History

Jama Masjid was built by Nawab Nawaei Muhammad Khan in 1750. He named it Kala Masjid and is also well known as Motijheel Mosque.

Ghaseti Begum, the eldest daughter of Nawab Alivardi Khan, adopted Ekramulla, the son of her younger sister Amina Begum and the younger brother of Siraj ud-Daulah, and brought him up as her own son. Ekramulla died at a young age. Ghaseti Begum's husband, Nawaei Muhammad Khan, could not bear the shock and died. Both of them were buried in the Jama Masjid compound. It is said that Nawab Alivardi Khan used to come regularly to the Jama Masjid to offer prayers.

According to the List of Monuments of National Importance in West Bengal the Motijheel Jama Mosque is an ASI Listed Monument.

Structure
Jama Masjid has three domes and a three arched façade. Banglapedia describes the mosque as being rectangular in plan and covered by three hemispherical domes. Octagonal minarets capped by bulbuous kiosks are placed in the four corners.

Jama Masjid picture gallery

See also
 Nawabs of Bengal and Murshidabad

References

External links

Mosques in Murshidabad
Tourist attractions in Murshidabad
Monuments of National Importance in West Bengal
Grand mosques